Marvel's Midnight Suns is a tactical role-playing game developed by Firaxis Games in collaboration with Marvel Games. It features comic book characters from multiple Marvel Comics properties, such as Midnight Sons, Avengers, X-Men, and Runaways. Players are able to create their own superhero named "The Hunter" with choice of over 40 different powers.

The game was announced at the virtual Gamescom 2021 in August, and was released on December 2, 2022 for PlayStation 5, Windows, and Xbox Series X/S. Versions for PlayStation 4, Xbox One and Nintendo Switch will launch at a later date. It received generally favorable reviews, but was considered "a commercial flop" due to slow sales.

Gameplay
Players take the role of "The Hunter", the sole offspring of Lilith, as they lead a selection of heroes in various missions to defeat her. The Hunter, a customizable superhero created specifically for Midnight Suns by Firaxis Games in collaboration with Marvel, can be played as either male or female. Players are able to choose The Hunter's superpowers from over 30 different abilities. 

Combat is turn-based similar to Firaxis Games' XCOM series, mixed with deck-building similar to that found in Slay the Spire. Each hero, including the Hunter, has their own customizable deck of eight cards. At the start of each mission, players are allowed to choose three heroes to take into battle, with their decks combined into one that is to be drawn from each round. The cards represent abilities that may affect either enemies or the player's own heroes. Heroes may also move or interact with objects in addition to making attacks.

Between combat missions, players manage their upgrade-able base of operations called "The Abbey" which they can walk around in a third-person view to explore the grounds and interact with other heroes. Role-playing elements such as interaction with other characters influence the gameplay and those heroes' abilities. The Abbey is also the main source for acquiring new cards for hero decks and upgrading them.

Playable characters
The base game includes 13 different heroes, including The Hunter, with four additional characters being released as DLC. 

Blade (Michael Jai White)
Captain America (Brian Bloom)
Captain Marvel (Erica Lindbeck)
Deadpool (Nolan North)
Doctor Strange (Rick Pasqualone)
Ghost Rider (Giancarlo Sabogal / Darin De Paul)
Hulk (William Salyers / Fred Tatasciore)
The Hunter (Elizabeth Grullon / Matthew Mercer)
Iron Man (Josh Keaton)
Magik (Laura Bailey)
Morbius
Nico Minoru (Lyrica Okano)
Scarlet Witch (Emily O'Brien)
Spider-Man (Yuri Lowenthal)
Storm
Venom (Darin De Paul)
Wolverine (Steve Blum)

: Available as downloadable content

Synopsis
Hydra scientist Doctor Faustus (voiced by Time Winters) uses dark magic and science to resurrect Lilith (Jennifer Hale) in the hopes of using her to help Hydra conquer the world. Six months later, a star called the "Midnight Sun" approaches Earth, destabilizing magic and heralding the return of Lilith's master, Chthon (Darin De Paul).

Doctor Strange and Tony Stark attempt to get a page of the Darkhold called the Parchment of Power from Johnny Blaze (Graham McTavish), but he refuses. After being alerted to magic converging at the Sanctum Sanctorum, the two are joined by Carol Danvers in returning to aid Wanda Maximoff in fighting Lilith and a Hydra squad until Strange can create a mystic shield to repel them. Realizing the Avengers are outmatched, Strange leaves Maximoff to maintain the shield while he takes the others to the Abbey to recruit the Midnight Suns -- Nico Minoru, Magik, Blade, and Robbie Reyes -- and Lilith's estranged sister, the Caretaker (Vanessa Marshall), in resurrecting the Hunter, Lilith's child and killer. During the resurrection ritual, the Hunter's collar emits dark magic, forcing Minoru to complete the spell. Strange attempts to contact Maximoff for help in restoring the Hunter's memories, but learns she is in trouble. He, the Hunter, and Blade travel to the Sanctum, where they learn Lilith has enthralled Venom to help her destroy the shield and abduct Maximoff. Venom overpowers the Hunter until Spider-Man intervenes, allowing the heroes to retreat.

After learning the Midnight Sun's gamma energy is preventing Bruce Banner from transforming into the Hulk, the heroes recruit Spider-Man before capturing Faustus to learn Lilith's next objective. While Hydra operative Crossbones (Rick Wasserman) kills him before he can talk, they find Faustus' journal and learn Hydra is stealing artifacts from the Sanctum. Meanwhile, Sabretooth (Peter Lurie) is hired to kill the Hunter, but is mortally wounded by Wolverine and rescued by Lilith, who destroys Avengers Tower to steal a gamma accelerator and enthralls Banner. The Hunter, Minoru, and Magik use a divination spell to teleport to a Hydra base, where Banner uses the accelerator to empower a similarly enthralled Maximoff. Unable to reason with her, the heroes retreat.

While stopping an attack by Lilith's demons, they recruit Wolverine and fashion a new suit for the Hunter so they can bypass the Hydra base's mystic defenses, use the accelerator to destroy the Parchment, and free Maximoff. Blaze contacts Reyes and gives him the Parchment of Power, but also attempts to give the Hunter to Mephisto (Jason Isaacs), trapping them in Limbo and preventing Lilith from reaching the Hunter. Despite this, Magik frees them so the heroes can enact their plan, banishing Sabretooth to Limbo along the way. Blaze sacrifices himself to destroy the Parchment via the accelerator, but Banner uses the device to transform into a smarter, demonic Hulk.

The heroes track Hydra and Lilith to her tomb, where Reyes tries to seal her and the Hulk in a cave before they can restore the Darkhold, but she unleashes demons around the world. After defeating Crossbones and his forces, the heroes steal a dagger imbued with Chthon's power while Maximoff and the Hunter subdue and free Banner. The heroes confront Lilith, who reveals her plot to destroy Chthon upon learning of his plans for her child and destroys the Hunter's collar, learning too late that it kept Chthon from possessing them. Nonetheless, the Hunter expels him while Lilith uses the dagger to destroy the Darkhold, restoring her human form. Realizing she and her child were corrupted by the grimoire, Lilith sends the heroes back to the Abbey while she, the Hunter, and Chthon's realm are consumed by the Darkhold. Nonetheless, the Caretaker believes that they are still alive.

Elsewhere, Doctor Doom (Graham McTavish) witnesses the events that transpired and takes the Darkhold for himself, deeming the other users "amateurs".

The Good, the Bad, and the Undead
While investigating an art collection that a Hydra battalion led by Sin has stolen, the Hunter encounters Deadpool, who was hired by Doom to recover a magic statue called the Magna Corrigo in the collection. After Sin betrays Hydra, steals the Magna Corrigo, and unleashes a group of infected "vampyres", the Hunter offers Deadpool sanctuary at the Abbey to protect him from Doom over the heroes' protest. With the Magna Corrigo in their possession, the vampyres become emboldened, publicly attacking innocents and establishing nests across Manhattan. With Deadpool's help, the Midnight Suns eventually track Sin to Transia, where she intends to use the Magna Corrigo in a ritual to empower the vampyres until Deadpool destroys it. Sin escapes and reports back to her master Dracula, who assures her the Magna Corrigo was not vital to his plans.

Redemption
Spider-Man and the Hunter locate Venom, who went underground and became infected from eating vampyres. Mephisto appears, offering to cure Venom in exchange for the heroes killing Dracula's forces, which Spider-Man agrees to. Upon being cured, Venom calls for a truce and joins the Midnight Suns. Seeking revenge for Dracula breaking a deal between them, Mephisto helps the Hunter, Venom, and Spider-Man find the vampyres' primary nest and Dracula himself. Working together, the trio destroy the nest and force Dracula to retreat.

Development
Rumors that Firaxis Games, the studio responsible for the Civilization and XCOM series of turn-based tactical strategy games, was developing a Marvel Universe-based game similar to XCOM emerged in early June 2021 ahead of E3 2021. Bloomberg's Jason Schreier confirmed that such a game was in development though was not sure when it was planned for the announcement.

Midnight Suns was announced during Gamescom 2021 on 25 August. It was given a scheduled release date of March 2022. In January 2022, Michael Jai White announced that he will be voicing Blade. In June 2022, alongside the reveal of Spider-Man as a playable character in the roster, it was announced that Yuri Lowenthal would be voicing Peter Parker in the game, reprising his role from the Marvel's Spider-Man games by Insomniac Games, and Marvel Ultimate Alliance 3: The Black Order (2019). Nico Minoru is voiced by Lyrica Okano, who reprises her role from the Marvel Cinematic Universe television series Runaways. According to the game's lead engineer Will Miller, the game has around "65,000 lines of voiced dialogue" and "over two hours of cinematics".

The game includes a tribute to Luke Wiltshire, who had died from long-term complications from neuroblastoma in November 2021 at the age of 23. Wiltshire had been told earlier that all treatment options had run out and was transitioned to end-of-life care. As part of his last wishes, he said he wanted to play Midnight Suns. The charity Solving Kids' Cancer put out a request on LinkedIn, which was seen by executives at 2K. 2K, Firaxis, and Marvel worked to create a playable build of the first act of the game within 24 hours and brought it to Wiltshire to play before he died.

Marketing and release
On September 1, 2021, a first game-play trailer was released showcasing the card system used in combat. Midnight Suns is directed by Jake Solomon. In November 2021, it was announced that the game had been delayed until the second half of 2022. The game was reintroduced during Summer Game Fest in June 2022 with new footage, additionally confirming the October 7, 2022 launch date for all platforms excluding Nintendo Switch, and revealing the additions of Venom, Hulk, Scarlet Witch, Doctor Strange and Spider-Man to the roster of characters. On August 8, 2022, the game was further delayed to the following year, with the PC, PlayStation 5 and Xbox Series X/S versions slated to launch during Take-Two Interactive's next fiscal year ending March 31, 2023, while the Nintendo Switch, PlayStation 4 and Xbox One versions were left undated. On September 10, 2022, it was announced that the PC, PlayStation 5 and Xbox Series X/S versions of the game would launch on December 2, 2022.

Reception 

According to Metacritic, Marvels Midnight Suns has received "generally favorable reviews", with the PC version currently scoring a 83 out of a 100.

According to Jason Schreier's interview with Strauss Zelnick (Take-Two Interactive CEO), despite the game being a critical success, it was a commercial flop. Zelnick thinks "it's possible the release window wasn't perfect" and that it could have a long tail (like other Firaxis games).

An application launcher in the PC version was noted as a major cause for stuttering and general performance issues in the game.

References

External links
 

2022 video games
2K games
Firaxis Games games
Nintendo Switch games
PlayStation 4 games
PlayStation 5 games
Role-playing video games
Superhero crossover video games
Turn-based tactics video games
Unreal Engine games
Video games based on Marvel Comics
Video games developed in the United States
Video games featuring protagonists of selectable gender
Video games set in Europe
Video games set in Massachusetts
Video games set in New York City
Video games set in the United States
Video games with customizable avatars
Windows games
Xbox One games
Xbox Series X and Series S games